P6 ATAV is an Indonesian Light Attack Vehicle, manufactured by PT Sentra Surya Ekayaja (SSE Defence). It made first public appearance in Indo Defence 2016. It is classified as rantis (kendaraan taktis — tactical vehicle) by Indonesian military.

Design 
P6 ATAV is manufactured by SSE Defence, the same company that manufactured P2 Pakci, P2 Commando, and P3 Cheetah. In general shape, P6 is similar to P3, but with wider and shorter body. P6 uses tubular frame and “open” body design without door and protective glass. It is constructed from high grade steel material and dual aluminium. Foreign vehicles that uses this body design is Light Strike Vehicle (Singapore) and General Dynamics Flyer.

P6 has 3 points for mounting weapons, preferably 7.62 mm MGs. The mounting is at the top of the vehicle, passenger left and passenger right side of the vehicle. In the future, it can be used to mount anti-tank missile, surface-to-air missile, and minigun. The P6 ATAV only has light armor protection (aluminium) to ensure its lightweight and agility.

In dimensions, P6 ATAV is 4.6 m long, 2.3 m wide, and 1.5 m high. For the engine, it uses 4-cylinder turbo diesel 2,300 cc. The power is 142 HP at 3,400 RPM. Just like Flyer, the engine is located at the rear. As an offroad vehicle, P6 uses independent suspension, and offroad winch. Although lightly armoured, P6 uses run flat tire and automatic transmission. At full fuel tank (120 litres), P6 is able to reach 500 km and achieve 120 km/hour top speed.

P6 ATAV V3 is a fully armoured variant with STANAG level 1 standard, with bullet-proof glass and runflat tires. Two units can be embarked in the C-130 Hercules. P6 ATAV V3 is equipped with Reutech RCWS with 7.62 mm or 12.7 mm guns, and Metravib PILAR gunshot detection system.

Users 
 Indonesian National Armed Forces : Used by Kopassus and Paskhas. 26 units for Indonesian army is delivered on 27 September 2021.

Gallery

See also 

 Light Strike Vehicle (Singapore)
 General Dynamics Flyer
 VLEGA Gaucho

References

External links 
 SSE Defence official website

Military light utility vehicles
Off-road vehicles
Military vehicles introduced in the 2010s
Military equipment of Indonesia
Post–Cold War military equipment of Indonesia
All-wheel-drive vehicles
Armoured cars
Military vehicles of Indonesia